Nikita Rochev (born 6 November 1992) is a Belarusian professional footballer who plays for Krumkachy Minsk.

References

External links
 
 

1992 births
Living people
Belarusian footballers
Association football defenders
Belarusian expatriate footballers
Expatriate footballers in Slovakia
Belarusian expatriate sportspeople in Slovakia
2. Liga (Slovakia) players
FC BATE Borisov players
FC Polotsk players
FC Slutsk players
FC Isloch Minsk Raion players
FC Lida players
FC Chist players
Partizán Bardejov players
FC Belshina Bobruisk players
FC Krumkachy Minsk players
People from Lida
Sportspeople from Grodno Region